One Bell is a pub in Old Road, Crayford, London, England.

It is a Grade II listed building, that dates from the 18th century and is owned by former professional footballer, Jimmy Bullard.

References

External links

Grade II listed pubs in London
Pubs in the London Borough of Bexley